Petter Winnberg (born November 19, 1979 in Lerum, Västergötland) is a Swedish producer, composer and musician. He is a member of the critically acclaimed Swedish band Amason, alongside Amanda Bergman, Gustav Ejstes, Pontus Winnberg, and Nils Törnqvist.

Aside from his work in Amason and other bands, Winnberg is also a composer for film and commercials and has done work for Vogue, H&M, HBO, Philips, Tork, and Netflix.

Discography

References

1979 births
Living people